William V. Roebuck (born 1954) is the executive vice president of the Arab Gulf States Institute in Washington. He most recently served as the deputy special envoy to the Global Coalition to Defeat ISIS and a senior advisor to the Special Representative for Syria Engagement Ambassador James Jeffrey. He is a former American ambassador who served as United States Ambassador to Bahrain.

Early life
Bill Roebuck, who is from Rocky Mount, North Carolina, graduated from high school in 1974.  He subsequently attended Wake Forest University, receiving a bachelor's and master's degree before attending the University of Georgia Law School.

Career
He was confirmed as ambassador on November 18, 2014 and presented his credentials on January 20, 2015. He succeeded Thomas C. Krajeski and was succeeded by Justin Siberell.

Activities in Syria
In August 2018, State Department representative William Roebuck traveled to the cities of Manbij and Kobani, both situated in Aleppo Governorate, as well as the town of Al-Shaddadah in Hasakah Governorate. He was later due to visit Deir ez-Zor Governorate which is held by U.S.-backed Kurdish forces. "We are prepared to stay here, as the president Donald Trump has made clear," he said after meeting with Democratic Federation of Northern Syria.

Criticisms of Turkish intervention
In November 2019, Roebuck "criticized the Trump administration for not trying harder to prevent Turkey’s military offensive" in northern Syria.

In November 2019, the New York Times reported that Ambassador William Roebuck, the senior U.S. diplomat in Syria drafted a memorandum to the U.S. Special Envoy to Syria James Jeffrey that stated directly that the U.S. should have done more to stop the Turkish invasion into Syria.  He said "Turkey’s military operation in northern Syria, spearheaded by armed Islamist groups on its payroll, represents an intentioned-laced effort at ethnic cleansing and what can only be described as war crimes and ethnic cleansing." He also warned that "we — with our local partners — have lost significant leverage and inherited a shrunken, less stable platform to support both our CT efforts and the mission of finding a comprehensive political solution for Syria."

Exit interview
In an interview with Defense One at the end of his career Roebuck commented on several areas. On Syria he said the damage to the relationship with the Syrian Democratic Forces has been repaired — because Donald Trump "ultimately agreed to keep a military presence in Syria, but we did lose significant leverage" amid the Turkish incursion into Syria, Roebuck said. "If you view our presence in northeast Syria as a source of leverage for some sort of future political solution [in the ongoing civil war in Syria], we pretty much overnight lost half of the territory that we were controlling, along with the SDF."

References

External links
 William V. Roebuck at the U.S. Department of State

Living people
Wake Forest University alumni
Ambassadors of the United States to Bahrain
University of Georgia alumni
United States Foreign Service personnel
1954 births
21st-century American diplomats